Beyond Tomorrow is an Australian television series produced by Beyond Television Productions. It began airing in 1981 as Towards 2000, then in 1985 was renamed Beyond 2000, a name the show kept until its cancellation in 1999. It then started airing again in 2005 with the name Beyond Tomorrow.

Towards 2000 and Beyond 2000
Towards 2000 debuted on the ABC in 1981 as a half-hour show dedicated to showcasing developments and inventions in science and technology. Original presenters were Jeffrey Watson, Sonia Humphrey and David Flatman. There were four series of the program (1981, 82, 83 and 84) and it was a popular and high rating success on the national broadcaster. After production finished on the 4th series, the ABC decided not to continue with Towards 2000, and instead started up a new science program, named Quantum, under the newly appointed Dick Gilling from BBCTV.

The Towards 2000 reporters then spoke with Ted Thomas, General Manager of ATN 7, who agreed that his network could start a new hour long production and name it Beyond 2000, airing until 1993 when it was picked up by Network Ten, airing until 1999. Beyond 2000 was also broadcast internationally, airing on the Discovery Channel in the United States and Canada, on RTÉ in the Republic of Ireland, and on the satellite channel Sky News in Europe and on TV One in New Zealand. An American-produced version of the show also aired on the Discovery Channel in 1992, with an American presenter (Henry Tenenbaum, presently an anchor/reporter for television station KRON San Francisco) used for the studio segments. An American version entitled Beyond Tomorrow was hosted by newsman Dave Marash and aired in the early years of the Fox television network.

Fourteen series of Towards/Beyond 2000 were produced, with the last being made in 1999 as a one-off, after a production break of about four years. At this point, the rising cost of producing the series, coupled with increased competition from other science and technology shows forced the closure of the program.

A Beyond 2000 website was published by the same company between 1999 and 2003. This provided science and technology news, as well as video clips from the old TV shows. The website was eliminated in a round of company-wide budget cuts that reflected a general downturn in the Australian media industry at the time.

Presenters
 Sonia Humphrey
 Iain Finlay
 Jeff Watson
 David Flatman
 Carmel Travers
 Chris Ardill-Guinness
 Simon Reeve
 Amanda Keller
 Andrew Carroll
 Maxine Gray
 Anthony Griffis
 Dr Caroline West
 Dr John D'Arcy
 Simon Nasht
 Sharon Nash
 Bryan Smith
 Tracey Curro
 Andrew Waterworth
 American versions were presented by Henry Tenenbaum, Dave Marash and Susan Hunt.

Beyond Tomorrow

In 2005, Beyond 2000 returned to the Seven Network under the new name of Beyond Tomorrow, with the first episode airing on 1 June 2005. Picking up where its predecessor left off, Beyond Tomorrow delved even deeper into the world of technological innovations and scientific breakthroughs in all areas of life including the environment, medicine, sport, computers, space, agriculture, transport, architecture, leisure and adventure. Topics ranged from how probes planted in the brain could be used to battle Parkinson's disease and obsessive compulsive disorder, to how the grumpiness of North Sea oil workers had led to a cure being found for snoring.

Segments from MythBusters, another Beyond Television production, also aired as part of the program, which was criticised by Australian viewers because Beyond Productions had also sold Mythbusters to SBS. Both shows aired at almost at the same time, with the Beyond Tomorrow version redubbing the American narrator with an Australian narrator and calling them "Beyond Tomorrow's Mythbusters", leaving some viewers feeling the company was insulting their intelligence by doing this double dip into the Australian market. The series had also been criticised by some fans of the earlier Beyond 2000 for featuring "futuristic" technologies that were obsolete or have been in common use for several years at the time. The theme music was also criticised for not being on par with Beyond 2000'''s, with some calling it lazy, generic and bland.Beyond Tomorrow also aired in the US on The Science Channel and on Discovery Channel Canada. Production of the show ended in 2007 after 50 episodes, however reruns still continue to air on The Science Channel.

Presenters
 Matt Shirvington
 Graham Phillips
 Hayden Turner
 Anna Choy
 Dr Caroline West
 Sara Groen
 Grant Denyer
 Kim Watkins (February 2006 - July 2006)

International
 In the United States, episodes of the series aired on the Fox network, under the Beyond Tomorrow name, from 1988 until 1990. The show was produced by Beyond International Group. From 1992 until its cancellation, the Discovery Channel aired Beyond 2000 with all of the episodes and segment introductions (along with new material) hosted by KRON-TV news anchor Henry Tenenbaum. 
 In Sweden, a version called Bortom 2000 was hosted by nature photographer Bo Landin on TV4 in the early 1990s. (The series was short lived, however.)
 In Malaysia, Beyond 2000 previously aired in the late 1980s through the early 1990s on RTM 1 (Later RTM TV1). Beyond Tomorrow would not be aired on the channel, but was eventually aired on the Discovery Channel (Southeast Asia) in the mid-2000s.
 In Indonesia, Beyond 2000 was aired on RCTI every Saturday morning in the early 1990s.
 In South Africa, Beyond 2000 was screened on M-Net and Bop TV.
 In Ireland, Beyond 2000 aired on RTÉ being shown on both networks One and Two.
 In Saudi Arabia, Beyond 2000 was shown on the English speaking television network Saudi 2.
 In New Zealand, Beyond 2000 was aired on TV One.
 In Jordan, Beyond 2000 was broadcast on the English, Arabic and French language television channel Channel 2 in English.
 In Kuwait, Beyond 2000 has been shown on KTV2, the country's governmental television channel dedicated for the English-speaking public.
 In Namibia, Beyond 2000'' began airing on SWABC (when the country was originally known as South West Africa at the time) in 1989 and then on NBC in March 1990 (several days after the country had changed its name to Namibia).

External links
 Beyond Tomorrow at Science Channel
 
 
 Beyond 2000 - Towards 2000 at the National Film and Sound Archive

References

Australian non-fiction television series
Australian Broadcasting Corporation original programming
Documentary television series about technology
Seven Network original programming
Network 10 original programming
Science Channel original programming
Science education television series
1981 Australian television series debuts
1995 Australian television series endings
2005 Australian television series debuts
2006 Australian television series endings
Television series by Beyond Television Productions
MythBusters